Thomas V. Kunnunkal (born 3 July 1926) is an Indian Jesuit priest, educationist and writer. He is a former chairman of the Central Board of Secondary Education (CBSE), a former director of the Indian Social Institute, New Delhi (2008–2009), and the President of the Islamic Studies Association, a non-governmental organization promoting religious harmony. The Government of India awarded him the fourth highest Indian civilian award of Padma Shri in 1974.

Biography
Thomas Kunnunkal was born on 3 July 1926 in Alappuzha, a coastal town in the south Indian state of Kerala, and completed his school education at a local boarding school. He completed his college education in India and later, in the US, majoring in English, Philosophy, Theology, Educational Administration and Educational Measurement, after which he joined the Society of Jesus on 20 June 1945. He started his career as the principal of St. Xavier's Senior Secondary School, New Delhi, and held the post for two terms (1962-1974 and 1977-1979). He headed the Central Board of Secondary Education of the Government of India from 1980 to 1987 and was the consultant to the Ministry of Human Resource Development for the turn-key project to establish the National Open School, New Delhi. When the institution was opened in 1989, Kunnunkal was appointed the chairman of the institution, a position he served in until 1992. He was associated with the Jesuit Education Association of India which controls 101 high schools and 25 colleges in India managed by the Society of Jesus, and was its president and the general secretary on different tenures.

Kunnunkal has served two central government commissions, National Commission for Teachers (1983) and National Commission for Review of National Education Policy (1987) as a member. He held the post of research director of the Indian Social Institute from 2008 to 2009 and was a founding member and former director of the Educational Planning Group (EPG) of the Roman Catholic Archdiocese of Delhi. He has also been associated with the Islamic Studies Association as its president and with Dharma Bharati Mission as an associate. He has published a book, The Role of Teachers in National Regeneration, which was released in 2005. The Government of India awarded him the civilian honour of Padma Shri in 1974 and he was selected as an honorary fellow of the Commonwealth of Learning, Vancouver, an intergovernmental organization under the Commonwealth Heads of Government (CHOGM), which promotes education, in 2006.

See also

 St. Xavier's School, Delhi
 National Institute of Open Schooling
 Society of Jesus
 Indian Social Institute

References

Further reading
 

1926 births
Living people
Recipients of the Padma Shri in literature & education
Christian clergy from Kerala
Malayali people
Indian Roman Catholic priests
20th-century Indian educational theorists
Social workers
Writers from Alappuzha
Indian male writers
20th-century Indian non-fiction writers